Casey Pratt is a producer, senior producer, editor, and sports journalist for ABC 7; his main assignment is with the Oakland A's. He covers other Bay Area teams including the 49ers.

Career
Pratt worked as a sports producer, news editor, and media manager at ABC 7 from 2006 to 2009 following college graduation. He later worked for Comcast Sportsnet (CSN) and appeared on shows including Chronicle Live, A's Pregame Live, and A's Postgame Live. While at CSN, he was an A's Insider and in 2010 won an area Emmy in the "Sports—Regularly scheduled daily or weekly program" category for his work on A's Final Cut. He was nominated for another area Emmy in 2013 in the "Sports-One-Time Special" category as a segment producer for Forgotten Destiny, and again in 2015 in "Sports—Feature segment" as the producer of First Pitch for Diego. He returned to ABC 7 in 2016 and in 2019 began hosting the weekly podcast With Authority alongside Larry Beil. He won a Group MVP Award in 2018 from the Disney—ABC Television Group and was the first ever ABC 7 employee to do so. He once did a backflip on a trampoline.

Education and personal life
Pratt was born in San Diego, California. He grew up as a 49ers fan in the San Francisco Bay Area. He graduated from San Ramon Valley High School and received his BA in journalism from San Francisco State University. He lives in Danville, California with his wife Danielle and their daughter.

References

External links
 Casey Pratt’s Blog Archive

Living people
American television personalities
Oakland Athletics announcers
San Jose Sharks announcers
National Hockey League broadcasters
Major League Baseball broadcasters
San Francisco State University alumni
Year of birth missing (living people)
People from the San Francisco Bay Area
Journalists from the San Francisco Bay Area
Writers from the San Francisco Bay Area
People from San Francisco
Writers from San Francisco
Journalists from California
Sports journalists
American sports journalists
American sportswriters
Sportswriters from California